Skei may refer to:

People
Hans H. Skei, a Norwegian writer

Places
Skei, Møre og Romsdal, a village in Surnadal municipality, Møre og Romsdal county, Norway
Skei, Innlandet, a village in Gausdal municipality, Innlandet county, Norway
Skei, Vestland, a village in Sunnfjord municipality, Vestland county, Norway
Skei, the old name (1885-1900) for Ogndal, a former municipality in Nord-Trondelag county, Norway
Skei Church, a church in Steinkjer municipality, Trøndelag county, Norway

Other uses
Skei may also refer to a type of longship used by the Vikings

See also 
 Skai (disambiguation)
 Skey